Art Shipyard (Turkish: Art Tersanesi) is a Turkish shipyard established in Tuzla, Istanbul in 1975.

See also 

 List of shipbuilders and shipyards

References

External links 

 Art Shipyard

Shipyards of Turkey
Shipbuilding companies of Turkey
Turkish companies established in 1975